Stephen Lewis Secondary School is a high school located in the Churchill Meadows neighbourhood of the city of Mississauga in Ontario, Canada and is a part of the Peel District School Board. It is one of two schools bearing this name. It opened in September 2006. Its feeder schools are Ruth Thompson Middle School and Erin Centre Middle School.
The top three school wide councils are the Student Activity Council (SAC), Athletics Council, and Integrated Arts Council (IAC). Other influential clubs include Green Revolution, DECA and MIST. Over 1600 students attend this school.

Community involvement 

Every year, the graduating class hosts a dinner and raises money for the organization Helping Hands for Honduras.  In December, the staff and students contribute to Share the Joy, a program that assists Peel families in need of food and other necessities during the holiday season.

Each year in the spring the school hosts charity week.  The week culminates in a car wash and carnival hosted by the school.  Throughout the last 8 years, the staff and students have raised over $100 000 for charitable organizations such as Right to Play, Mad for Maddie, and Princess Margaret Foundation.

On May 16, 2012, students hosted the second annual Relay for Life event. Over 300 students, staff and community members participated in this all-night fundraiser in an effort to celebrate cancer survivors, remember loved ones and fight back by finding a cure. The school raised $30,000, which was donated directly to the Canadian Cancer Society.

Extracurricular activities 

Stephen Lewis Secondary School offers a variety of extracurricular activities for students. The athletic teams are heavily supported by the student body and have high spectator turnout during home games. These athletic teams are represented by the school's mascot, known as the Lewis Lynx and teams are referred to as a lynx pack. The Sports include: Basketball, Soccer, Rugby, Tennis, Swimming, Cross Country, Cricket, Flag Football, Lacrosse, Baseball, Volleyball, Track & Field, and Wrestling. A multitude of clubs are also offered, including: Amnesty International, DECA, Animé Club, Arts Productions, Yearbook committee, Chess Club, a Dance Club, Green Revolution, Design and Build Club, Poets @ Lewis (poetry club), Sears Drama Festival, reading clubs, music clubs, game clubs, and more.

Villages 

All students and staff are assigned to one of the four villages upon registration. The Stephen Lewis Villages are named after four globally renowned Canadian heroes of social justice: June Callwood, Craig Kielburger, Agnes Macphail and David Suzuki. The grouping of students into teams allows all students to feel connected and encourages friendly competition and spirit between the Villages.

Campus 

Stephen Lewis Secondary School has a modern architectural design from the interior and exterior. The building has three floors in the frontal area, and it is connected to Applewood School; a school for students aged 14 to 21 with developmental disabilities. The campus has above average building facilities including a broadcast studio, a darkroom for photography, a large cafetorium (cafeteria/auditorium hybrid), a large 3-section gym making it one of the largest gyms in Peel, dance and photo studios, equipped science labs and an auto workshop. The building features state-of-the-art glass ceilings and walls in the atrium and cafeteria for efficient energy use. All classrooms are equipped with projectors, administrative computers, and printers. The facility has a number of computer labs and Mac labs. The gym features a rock-climbing wall in the north gym, and can be separated into three smaller gyms with the help of a retractable wall and curtain. Outside the building is a multi-purpose field and a track that is shared by the community.

Notable alumni
Jacob Bae, member of South Korean boy group The Boyz

See also
List of high schools in Ontario
Churchill Meadows

External links
 Stephen Lewis Secondary School website

Peel District School Board
High schools in Mississauga
Educational institutions established in 2006
2006 establishments in Ontario